The Stade du 4-août (4 August Stadium) is a multi-purpose stadium in Ouagadougou, Burkina Faso. It is currently used mostly for football matches and also has an athletics track. The stadium has a capacity of 29,800 people. Étoile Filante de Ouagadougou play their home games at the stadium.

References

External links

Photo at cafe.daum.net/stade
Photo at worldstadiums.com
Photos at fussballtempel.net
Stadium at Openstreetmap

Football venues in Burkina Faso
Sports venues in Burkina Faso
Athletics (track and field) venues in Burkina Faso
Burkina Faso
Buildings and structures in Ouagadougou
Multi-purpose stadiums
Étoile Filante de Ouagadougou
Salitas FC
Sports venues completed in 1984
1984 establishments in Burkina Faso